World Cocktail Day is a global celebration of cocktails; it marks the publication date of the first definition of a cocktail on May 13 in 1806.

The New York tabloid The Balance and Columbian Repository defined a cocktail as "a stimulating liquor, composed of spirits of any kind, sugar, water and bitters". It was written by editor Harry Croswell in response to a reader’s inquiry.

References 

 https://www.diffordsguide.com/cocktails/on-this-day/may/13
 https://www.telegraph.co.uk/food-and-drink/cocktails/world-cocktail-day-amazing-cocktail-recipes-from-across-the-glob/
 https://jandbenterprises.co.za/78-cocktail-recipes/

International observances